Stacher is a surname. Notable people with the surname include:

Ally Stacher (born 1987), American cyclist
Joseph Stacher ( 1902–1977), American mobster
Joshua Stacher (born 1975), American political scientist

See also
Sacher